Raphael Hugh Oswald Wallace (born 29 May 1957) is a former Nevisian cricketer who played several matches with the Leeward Islands in West Indian domestic cricket. From Charlestown, the island's capital and largest town, Wallace regularly represented Nevis in inter-island matches, playing from the late 1970s through to the late 1980s. A right-arm fast bowler, he made his first-class debut for the Leewards during the 1979–80 season, in the semi-annual matches against the Windward Islands. In the match, played at the Antigua Recreation Ground, Wallace took 2/33 in the Windwards' first innings, but in the second innings went wicketless, also scoring six runs without losing his wicket. He did not play any further matches at first-class level, but several seasons later played twice for the team in the limited-overs Geddes Grant/Harrison Line Trophy. Wallace took a single wicket in a match against Barbados in February 1984, and two wickets against the same team just over a year later, opening the bowling with Conrad Bartlette. His brother, Leon Claxton, also played representative cricket for Nevis, and his son, Philo Wallace, currently plays for Nevisian under-age teams.

References

External links
Player profile and statistics at CricketArchive
Player profile and statistics at ESPNcricinfo

1957 births
Leeward Islands cricketers
Living people
Nevisian cricketers
West Indian cricketers of 1970–71 to 1999–2000